Adolphe Tonduz (1862-1921) was a Swiss botanist who collected plants in both Guatemala and Costa Rica. He was the first director of the National Herbarium of Costa Rica, which was founded in 1887. Together with Henri Pittier he published 'Primitae Florae Costaricensis' and 'Herborisations au Costa Rica'.

Honours and namesakes

Species named after Tonduz

These species were discovered from specimens collected by Tonduz and were unknown to science at the time.

Acronia tonduzii
Anemopaegma tonduzianum
Anthurium tonduzii
Calyptranthes tonduzii
Cedrela tonduzii
Quercus tonduzii
Weberocereus tonduzii

References

External links
HUH Botanists Index
Herbario Nacional de Costa Rica

19th-century Swiss botanists
Botanists active in Central America
1862 births
1921 deaths
Swiss expatriates in Costa Rica
20th-century Swiss botanists